Lake View (alternatively Lakeview) is a locality in South Australia beside the Augusta Highway between Snowtown and Redhill. The name is from that of the historic railway siding, Lake View Railway Station, within the locality and refers to the string of small salt lakes at the location, beside Barunga East Road.

References

Towns in South Australia